Jhagadiya is one of the 182 Legislative Assembly constituencies of Gujarat state in India. It is part of Bharuch district and is reserved for candidates belonging to the Scheduled Tribes.

List of segments
This assembly seat represents the following segments,

 Jhagadia Taluka
 Valia Taluka
 Netrang taluka

Members of Legislative Assembly

Election results

2022

2017

2012

2007

2002

See also
 List of constituencies of the Gujarat Legislative Assembly
 Bharuch district
 Gujarat Legislative Assembly

References

External links
 

Assembly constituencies of Gujarat
Bharuch district